Brothers Till We Die  is a 1977 Italian poliziottesco-action film  by Umberto Lenzi and fifth and final entry into the Tanzi/Moretto/Monnezza shared universe. This film is the last collaboration among Lenzi and Tomas Milian. In this movie Milian plays two characters, Vincenzo Marazzi a.k.a. "The Hunchback" that he already played for Lenzi in The Tough Ones, and his twin brother Sergio Marazzi a.k.a. "Er Monnezza", a role that he played for the first time in Lenzi's Free Hand for a Tough Cop and later resumed in Destruction Force by Stelvio Massi.

Plot 
The notorious Italian criminal known as "Hunchback" (Italian: il gobbo) returns in Rome from Corsica after his imprisonment. Together with his younger brother and other accomplices he plans to raid an armoured truck. But things go awry.

Cast 
 Tomas Milian: Vincenzo Marazzi, a.k.a. "Il Gobbo" (The Hunchback)/ Sergio Marazzi, a.k.a. "Er Monnezza" (a double role)
 Pino Colizzi: Commissioner Sarti
 Mario Piave:  Commissioner Valenzi
 Isa Danieli: Maria
 Sal Borgese: Milo Dragovic, a.k.a. "Albanese"
 Luciano Catenacci: Perrone
 Guido Leontini: Mario Di Gennaro, a.k.a. "Er Sogliola"
 Nello Pazzafini: Carmine Ciacci
 Solvi Stubing: Marika Engver

Release
Brothers Til We Die was released in Italy on 18 August 1977 where it was distributed by Medusa. It grossed 1,523,844,720 Italian lire domestically.

Footnotes

References

External links

1977 films
Films directed by Umberto Lenzi
Films scored by Franco Micalizzi
Poliziotteschi films
1977 action films
1970s Italian films